
Łańcut County is a unit of territorial administration and local government (powiat) in Subcarpathian Voivodeship, south-eastern Poland. It came into being on January 1, 1999, as a result of the Polish local government reforms passed in 1998.

As of 2019 its total population was 80,898, out of which 22% in urban areas.

Neighbouring counties
Łańcut County is bordered by Leżajsk County to the north, Przeworsk County to the east, and Rzeszów County to the west.

Administrative division
The county is subdivided into seven gminas (one urban and six rural). These are listed in the following table, in descending order of population.

Places of interest 

 Markowa Ulma-Family Museum of Poles Who Saved Jews in World War II, the first museum in Poland, dedicated to the rescue of Jewish population in occupied Poland during World War II. Opened in March 2016, the Ulma Family Museum of Poles Saving Jews in World War II  was designed by Mirosław Nizio, known for his modern design of architectural objects and interiors.
 Łańcut Castle Museum, located in one of the most beautiful aristocratic residences in Poland, the Łańcut castle. The castle, along with pavilions and farm buildings is surrounded by historic and picturesque English park. The complex is of great historic importance for Polish and European cultural heritage.
 Pottery Centre  in Medynia Głogowska, shows the pottery tradition of te region. It is located in a beautiful 19th-century wooden building. Shows, workshops and lectures are organised here. There is also an exposition of pottery and clay sculptures from the early 20th century. The pottery fair is organised every year in July.
 Łańcut synagogue, built in 1761 is one of the most spectacular synagogues preserved in Central Europe. The temple was financed by Stanisław Lubomirski, the leading protector of Jews in Łańcut. The synangoue is located on the Chassidic Route linking 30 towns in Eastern Poland with the most valuable monuments of Jewish culture in south-eastern Poland.
 Orthodox art in the Łańcut castle (located in the eastern wing of the stable), the biggest collection of Ukrainian Orthodox art in Poland. The collection not only includes icons, but also flags, processional crosses, books, textiles and liturgical vessels.

International relations

Twin towns — Sister cities
Łańcut County is twinned with: "News (in Polish)"

Gallery

References

 
Land counties of Podkarpackie Voivodeship